Robert E. Nyce (born October 14, 1946) is a former Republican member of the Pennsylvania House of Representatives.  A graduate of Northampton Area Senior High School, Northampton, PA and Moravian College, Bethlehem, PA for over twenty years he was a tax professional working at Lehigh Portland Cement Company, Allentown, PA from 1970 to 1973, Manager, Credit Taxes, Insurance and Payroll at Frick Company, Waynesboro, PA from 1973 to 1975, Senior Tax Accountant for Bethlehem Steel Corporation from 1975 to 1985 and Asst. Vice President, Taxes for Chrysler First, Inc., Allentown, PA from 1985 to 1990.  He was a member of the Tax Executives Institute including Chairman of the State Tax Committee in the 1980s.  During his private sector employment, Mr. Nyce was active in his community of East Allen Township.  From 1979 to 1984 he served as a member and Chairman of the East Allen Township Municipal Authority and again from 2007 to 2013 as a member and Treasurer.  From 2011 to  2013 Mr. Nyce negotiated and helped close the sale of the East Allen Township Municipal Authority's assets to The City of Bethlehem and the Bath Borough Municipal Authority thereby ensuring high quality service of water and sewer for the future for all residents of East Allen Township.  From 1984 to 1990, Mr. Nyce served on the Northampton Area School District Board of Directors as member, Vice Chairman and Chairman.  He also served on the Bethlehem Area Vocational Technical School Joint Operating Committee as member, Vice Chairman and Chairman.  In both capacities, he was responsible for normal business operations and participated in union contract negotiations with staff.  In 1990, Mr. Nyce ran for and was elected State Representative for the 138th PA House District encompassing parts of Northampton and Monroe Counties.  During his three terms in the House of Representatives he served on several important committees:  Education, Local Government, Fish and Game, Finance to name a few.  In 1996 he ran for PA Auditor General in an unsuccessful bid to represent the people of PA as their financial watchdog.  Following the campaign, he was hired as the Executive Director of the Pennsylvania Independent Regulatory Review Commission (IRRC).  Mr. Nyce served for eight years in that capacity overseeing two major revisions to the Regulatory Review Act and many significant regulatory issues facing the residents of Pennsylvania.  The PA IRRC reviews all regulations promulgated in PA and provides citizens an opportunity to comment on and affect those regulations prior to their promulgation by the state agency that authored the regulation.  The two exceptions are the PA Fish and Boat Commission and the PA Game Commission which remain outside the regulatory review process.  In 2005, Mr. Nyce retired from state government and now resides in Northampton County.  He has been a member of the Free and Accepted Masons of PA since 1971 and the Rajah Shrine, Reading, PA since the mid-ninety's.  Mr. Nyce is a past member of the Northampton Exchange Club.  Mr. Nyce served in the U.S. Army from 1966 to 1969.  Having completed his basic training at Fort Knox, Kentucky and Advanced Individual Training at Fort Lewis, Washington he was assigned to the 1st Battalion, 3rd Infantry Unit, "The Old Guard" at Arlington National Cemetery where he served for about two and one half years attaining the rank of Staff Sergeant, E-6 before taking an early release to return to Moravian College in September 1969.  While serving at Arlington, SSG Nyce participated in former President Dwight D. Eisenhower's funeral, President Nixon's Inauguration and Robert F. Kennedy's Funeral.

References

Republican Party members of the Pennsylvania House of Representatives
Living people
1946 births